The Ming-Kush ( or Миң-Куш) is a river in Jumgal District of Naryn Region of Kyrgyzstan. It rises on north slopes of Moldo Too and flows into Kökömeren river from the left. The maximum discharge is in June - July and the minimum in January - February. The river is majorly fed by springs (42%), glaciers (28%) and snow (25.4%).

References

Rivers of Kyrgyzstan